Yevgeni Anatolyevich Podgorny (born 9 July 1977 in Novosibirsk) is a former Olympic gymnast who competed for Russia in the two Olympic Games. He won a gold medal in the 1996 and a bronze medal in the 2000 Olympic Games.

See also
List of Olympic male artistic gymnasts for Russia

External links
 Yevgeny Podgorny Bio, Stats, and Results | Olympics at Sports-Reference.com | Wayback Machine

1977 births
Living people
Russian male artistic gymnasts
Gymnasts at the 1996 Summer Olympics
Gymnasts at the 2000 Summer Olympics
Olympic gymnasts of Russia
Olympic gold medalists for Russia
Olympic bronze medalists for Russia
Sportspeople from Novosibirsk
Medalists at the World Artistic Gymnastics Championships
Olympic medalists in gymnastics

Medalists at the 2000 Summer Olympics
Medalists at the 1996 Summer Olympics
20th-century Russian people